Captain Hurricane was a fictional comic book character in Fleetway Publications' Valiant during the 1960s and 1970s, first appearing in issue #1 (Oct 1962). Captain Hurricane's adventures were scripted by the likes of Scott Goodall and Desmond Pride; Jon Rose also wrote some stories in the 1970s. R. Charles Roylance drew the strip for many years.

Hercules Hurricane was a former ship's captain who subsequently joined the British Royal Marines Commandos, fighting against the German and Japanese armed forces in the 2nd World War. With his batman, "Maggot" Malone (previously a ship's cook), he battled the Axis powers with his superhuman strength that appeared whenever he became enraged.

After the Captain Hurricane strip ended in 1976, he was listed as "editor" of Battle for many years.

A similar character, named simple "Hurricane", appears in Paul Grist's Jack Staff series; Captain Hurricane himself is portrayed as a prison guard in the 2006 limited series Albion, published by DC/WildStorm.

References

Captain Hurricane
Comics characters introduced in 1962
Fictional World War II veterans
Fictional special forces personnel
Fictional Royal Marines personnel
Fictional military captains
Fictional super soldiers
Captain Hurricane
Comics characters with superhuman strength